Road 55 connects Persian Gulf and Bushehr to Isfahan and central Iran to Road 65. The road is of a national importance with regard to transit, as it is the shortest and fastest link connecting Isfahan and places north of it with Bushehr and Asaluyeh on the coast of Persian Gulf

References

External links 

 Iran road map on Young Journalists Club

Roads in Iran